The 1991 Greenlandic Men's Football Championship was the 21st edition of the Greenlandic Men's Football Championship. The final round was held in Sisimiut. It was won by Kissaviarsuk-33 for the sixth time in its history.

Qualifying stage

Disko Bay
All matches were played in Aasiaat.

Central Greenland

Group A
All matches were played in Nuuk.

Group B
All matches were played in Sisimiut.

South Greenland
All matches were played in Qaqortoq.

Final round

Pool 1

Pool 2

Playoffs

Semi-finals

Fifth-place match

Third-place match

Final

See also
Football in Greenland
Football Association of Greenland
Greenland national football team
Greenlandic Men's Football Championship

References

Greenlandic Men's Football Championship seasons
Green
Green
Foot